Aga Khan Hospital may refer to:

Aga Khan Hospital, Dar es Salaam
Aga Khan Maternal and Child Care Centre, Hyderabad
Aga Khan Hospital for Women, Karimabad
Aga Khan Hospital, Kisumu
Aga Khan Hospital, Mombasa
Aga Khan University Hospital, Karachi
Aga Khan University Hospital, Nairobi
Aga Khan University Hospital, Kampala
Prince Aly Khan Hospital, Mumbai

See also
Aga Khan Development Network
Aga Khan Health Services
Aga Khan University